Martin Sonnenberg (born January 23, 1978) is a Canadian former professional ice hockey forward who played three seasons in the National Hockey League (NHL) for the Pittsburgh Penguins and Calgary Flames.

Playing career 
Sonnenberg was born in Wetaskiwin, Alberta. Undrafted, Sonnenberg started his professional hockey career with the Saskatoon Blades of the WHL in 1995. He signed with the Pittsburgh Penguins in 1998, and after several years in the NHL and AHL Sonnenberg signed with KalPa of the Finnish SM-liiga in 2006. He was named captain of KalPa, becoming the first foreign-born captain in the league. At the end of the 2006–07 season he decided to retire from professional hockey, however, in the Winter of 2007 Sonnenberg received the call of HC Ambrì-Piotta, a Swiss club of the National League A.

During his second season in Switzerland, Sonnenberg left Piotta on January 13, 2009, after he signed a contract with Timrå IK of the Swedish Elitserien. In his first full season with the club in 2009–10, Sonnenberg became a fan favourite and led the club with 20 goals for 42 points in 42 games. Despite a willingness to continue on with Timrå, Sonnenberg was forced to retire from professional hockey due to a chronic knee injury. He returned to Canada to work in a family owned construction firm.

Career statistics

References

External links 
 

1978 births
Living people
HC Ambrì-Piotta players
Calgary Flames players
Canadian ice hockey left wingers
Hartford Wolf Pack players
KalPa players
Lowell Lock Monsters players
People from Wetaskiwin
Pittsburgh Penguins players
Saint John Flames players
San Antonio Rampage players
Saskatoon Blades players
Syracuse Crunch players
Timrå IK players
Undrafted National Hockey League players
Utah Grizzlies (AHL) players
Wilkes-Barre/Scranton Penguins players
Canadian expatriate ice hockey players in Finland
Canadian expatriate ice hockey players in Switzerland
Canadian expatriate ice hockey players in Sweden